Ad Ali Bakhit is a village in central Eritrea located approximately 25 km south-west of Keren, the second largest city in the country. It is located in Hagaz District in the Anseba region.

Villages in Eritrea